The Rex Kingsley Footballer of the Year was an award given annually to the Scottish footballer who was adjudged to have been the best of that year (calendar year and not season) in Scottish football between 1951–1964. The award was handed out by Rex Kingsley of the Sunday Mail. As there were no Football Writers' awards (until the SFWA awards in 1965) or Players' Association awards (until the PFA Scotland awards in 1978), the Rex Kingsley Footballer of the Year award was generally considered to be the most prestigious of its type at the time.

List of Winners

Winners by club

References 

Scottish football trophies and awards
Footballers in Scotland
Awards established in 1951
Awards disestablished in 1964
Association football player non-biographical articles